Marion County is a county located in the U.S. state of Tennessee. It is located in East Tennessee. As of the 2020 census, the population was 28,837. Its county seat is Jasper. Marion County is part of the Chattanooga, AL–TN–GA Metropolitan Statistical Area.  Marion County is in the Central time zone, while Chattanooga proper is in the Eastern time zone.

History
Marion County was established in 1817.
In 1779 Cherokee chief Dragging Canoe moved down the Tennessee River from Chickamauga Creek to Running Water creek, and he helped establish the town of Nickajack at the entrance of Nickajack Cave. In 1794, the town was attacked and burned by militiamen commanded by Colonel James Orr of Nashville, Tennessee. The town was rebuilt and the Chickamauga Indians continued to live here until 1838, when all of the remaining Indians were removed from Tennessee, Alabama, and Georgia by the Trail of Tears.

During the spring of 1861, early in the American Civil War, Robert Cravens of Chattanooga began mining saltpeter, the main ingredient of gunpowder, at Nickajack Cave. The operation was soon taken over by the Confederate Niter Bureau. At one point, Nickajack Cave was one of the main sources of saltpeter for the Confederate States of America. However, its operation was halted in late 1862.  Nickajack Cave was visited by thousands of soldiers of both side troops, who travelled up and down the Tennessee River on steamboats.

During the war, it was officially referred to as Battle Creek Cave. A 1917 visitor reported that about 25 or 30 old hoppers still remained in the cave.

By the late 19th and early 20th centuries, coal and iron mining industries had come to dominate Marion County's economy. Mines operated in Whitwell and Inman, while iron smelters were at South Pittsburg.

Hales Bar Dam, built on the Tennessee River in Marion County between 1905 and 1913, was one of the first major dams constructed in the United States across a navigable stream. in the 1960s, the Tennessee Valley Authority replaced Hales Bar with Nickajack Dam, further downstream in the 1960s, though the Hales Bar powerhouse still stands as a boathouse.

Geography

Marion is one of three Tennessee counties, along with Bledsoe and Sequatchie, located in the Sequatchie Valley, a long, narrow valley slicing through the southeastern Cumberland Plateau. The Sequatchie River, which drains the valley, empties into the Tennessee River just south of Jasper.

Nickajack Dam is located along the Tennessee River near Jasper, creating Nickajack Lake. The section of the river immediately downstream from the dam is part of Guntersville Lake.  The Raccoon Mountain Pumped-Storage Plant is located in the extreme southeastern part of the county.

Adjacent counties
 Grundy County (north)
 Sequatchie County (northeast)
 Hamilton County (east/EST Border)
 Dade County, Georgia (southeast/EST Border)
 Jackson County, Alabama (southwest)
 Franklin County (west)

State protected areas
 Chimneys State Natural Area
 Cummings Cove Wildlife Management Area
 Franklin State Forest (part)
 Hicks Gap State Natural Area
 Prentice Cooper State Forest
 Sequatchie Cave State Natural Area
 South Cumberland State Park (part)

Demographics

2020 census

As of the 2020 United States census, there were 28,837 people, 11,477 households, and 8,114 families residing in the county.

2010 census
As of the census of 2010, there were 28,237 people, 11,403 households, and 8,030 families residing in the county. There were 12,954 housing units at an average density of 26 per square mile (10/km2).

The racial makeup of the county was 93.9% White(non-Hispanic), 3.6% Black or African American, 0.4% Native American, 0.21% Asian, 0.01% Pacific Islander, 0.27% from other races, and 1.2% from two or more races.  1.3% of the population were Hispanic or Latino of any race.

In the county, the population was spread out, with 22.80% under the age of 18 and 8.9% who were 65 years of age or older.  The median age was 43.9 years. The female population was 50.9%.

The median income for a household in the county was $31,419, and the median income for a family was $36,351. Males had a median income of $30,236 versus $21,778 for females. The per capita income for the county was $16,419.  About 10.80% of families and 14.10% of the population were below the poverty line, including 20.00% of those under age 18 and 14.30% of those age 65 or over.

Education
The schools in Marion County are:
 Jasper Elementary School
 Jasper Middle School
 Marion County High School
 Monteagle Elementary School
 South Pittsburg Elementary
 South Pittsburg High School
 Whitwell Elementary School
 Whitwell Middle School
 Whitwell High School
 Richard Hardy Memorial School

Media

Marion County is served by numerous local, regional and national media outlets which reach approximately one million people in four states including: Tennessee, Alabama, Georgia and North Carolina.

Newspapers
 The Marion County News: Jasper Journal and South Pittsburg Hustler Combined has incorporated the Jasper Journal and the South Pittsburg Hustler into a single weekly publication. The periodical focuses its energy on highlighting events, sports and people in Marion County, TN.

Radio
Marion County is part of the Chattanooga Arbitron radio market. The following radio stations are licensed to cities within Marion County:

AM
 WEPG 910 AM – Country (Licensed to South Pittsburg)

FM
 WUUQ 97.3 – Classic Country Q-97.3/99.3 (Licensed to South Pittsburg)
 W285FW 104.9 - 104.9 The River WEPG (FM translator for WEPG-AM Licensed to South Pittsburg)
 WJCR-LP-94.7 - Jasper Christ-Centered Radio (Licensed to Jasper)

Television
Marion County is part of the Chattanooga DMA. Cable TV companies in Marion County include Charter Communications and Trinity Cable

Transportation

Airport
Marion County Airport, also known as Brown Field, is a county-owned, public-use airport located four nautical miles (7 km) southeast of the central business district of Jasper.

Roads
 
 
 
 
 
 
 
 
 
 
 
 
 
 
 Orme Mountain Road

Parks and natural features

Nickajack Cave in Marion County, located 0.6 miles south of Shellmound Station on the west side of the Tennessee River, is one of the most historical caves in Tennessee. It is currently part of a park run by the city of New Hope. A paved hiking trail leads to an observation deck at the entrance to the cave where visitors can watch the bats leave the cave at dusk.

Communities

Cities
 Chattanooga (mostly in Hamilton)
 New Hope
 South Pittsburg
 Whitwell

Towns
 Jasper (county seat)
 Kimball
 Monteagle (also in Franklin and Grundy Counties)
 Orme
 Powells Crossroads

Unincorporated communities
 Aetna
 Griffith Creek
 Haletown
 Jasper HIghlands
 Mineral Springs
 Sequatchie
 Suck Creek
 Whiteside (formerly Running Water)

Politics
Prior to 2004, Marion County was a Democratic-leaning swing county in presidential elections, backing the national winner in all but five elections from 1912 to 2004. Since then, it has become increasingly Republican similar to the rest of rural Tennessee, with Republican presidential candidates winning by increasing margins in each election from 2004 on. Donald Trump won the county in 2020 by a margin of nearly 51 points, the widest in the county's electoral history from 1912 on for a candidate of any party.

Notable people
 Eddie Brown, NFL player
 Jon Coffelt (b. May 16, 1963) Artist who was born in Dunlap, Tennessee, raised in Griffith Creek.
 Leslie Rogers Darr, United States District Judge, Eastern District of Tennessee
 Dragging Canoe, Cherokee leader, lived in the town of Running Water at the mouth of Running Water creek on the Tennessee River.
 Travis Randall McDonough, United States District Judge, Eastern District of Tennessee
 John T. Raulston, Judge who presided over the Scopes Trial in 1925.
 Sequoyah, Cherokee scholar, lived in the Marion County area. 
 Peter Turney, Governor of Tennessee and Chief Justice of the Tennessee Supreme Court, was born in Jasper.
 Eric Westmoreland, NFL player

See also
 National Register of Historic Places listings in Marion County, Tennessee

References

External links

 Marion County Chamber of Commerce
 Marion County Schools
 Marion County, TNGenWeb - free genealogy resources for the county
 

 
Chattanooga metropolitan area counties
Counties of Appalachia
1817 establishments in Tennessee
Populated places established in 1817
East Tennessee